Luxury trains are a premium travel option designed to offer a comfortable ride and evoke an association with history and heritage. Some luxury trains promote tourism in destinations across a region, while others (such as the Maharajas' Express) take passengers on a long, leisurely ride through a single country.

Luxury train travel has become popular, and its advocates cite several advantages over air travel. They say air travel can be monotonous, while passengers on a luxury train can see the local environment, social and economic conditions, and a myriad of colors during their travels. Unlike airplanes, luxury trains are spacious and have restaurants and bars, comfortable sleeping and seating areas, and bathrooms.

History

Before sleeping and dining cars were introduced, long-distance train travel was an uncomfortable experience. George Pullman's first sleeping car, the Pioneer, was introduced in 1865 and was followed two years later by "hotel cars". The Pioneer was the first railway carriage with dining and sleeping areas, and the Pullman Car Company was founded in 1880.

Georges Nagelmackers founded the Compagnie Internationale des Wagons-Lits, creator of the Orient Express. Inspired by Pullman trains in the United States, Nagelmackers returned to Europe and built a fleet of over 30 luxury trains which traveled to several European destinations. He is credited with beginning the age of luxury trains and grand hotels.

The best-known luxury train was the Orient Express, the setting of Agatha Christie's Murder on the Orient Express. Europe's first luxury train, it began its maiden journey across Europe on 5 June 1883 from Paris' Gare de l'Est. Although the original Orient Express ceased operations in 2009, private operators and public-private joint ventures provide luxury train travel in several countries.

Belmond trains 

According to Belmond  (formerly known as Orient Express Hotels), the company operates the highest number of luxury train tours in the world. With service in Europe, Asia and South America, Belmond is the only private luxury tour provider (with the exception of Russia's Golden Eagle Trans Siberian Express) to offer continental or intercontinental service.

The Venice-Simplon Orient Express, with service from London to Venice, was voted the top luxury train in the world in 2009. The Royal Scotsman offers service across Scotland and, occasionally, the rest of Britain. The Belmond Grand Hibernian began operations in Ireland on 30 August 2016.

The Eastern and Oriental Express has service from Bangkok to Singapore (via Kuala Lumpur) and to Vientiane.

The Belmond Andean Explorer services Arequipa to Cusco and vice versa and the Belmond Hiram Bingham, named after the explorer who rediscovered the Inca citadel Machu Picchu, runs from the Sacred Valley to the landmark.

United Kingdom

British Pullman cars were used on the Brighton Belle out of London Victoria station.

Northern Belle
Northern Belle is a privately owned luxury train introduced in 2000. It consists primarily of British Rail Mark 2 coach stock, refurbished internally and painted externally to resemble the Brighton Belle British Pullman coaches. Buffet cars are British Rail Mark 1 coaches. Although the train primarily operates in Northern England and Scotland, it also serves London and Bristol. The train has two British Rail Mark 3 sleeper coaches for its crew. It departs from a number of northern cities, including Liverpool, Edinburgh, Glasgow, and Manchester. The Northern Belle has six dining cars named after historic British houses.

Spain
Spain's state-owned network of luxury trains is operated by Renfe Operadora and runs from March to October on scheduled and charter trips. The main routes cross northern Spain and Andalusia, with special tours throughout the peninsula.

Al Ándalus 
The Al Ándalus' luxury cars were built in France for use by members of the British monarchy when they travelled between Calais and the French Riviera. The main route takes passengers from Seville to Cádiz, Jerez de la Frontera, Ronda, Granada, Úbeda, Baeza, Linares, Córdoba, Andalusia, and back to Seville.
Al-Andalus Train

El Transcantábrico 

The oldest tourist train in Spain (operating since 1983), the El Transcantábrico has original 1923 Pullman coaches. There are two routes: the Gran Lujo between San Sebastián and Santiago de Compostela, and the Clasico between León and Santiago de Compostela via Bilbao.

Transcantabrico Train

El Expreso de la Robla 
The common areas of El Expreso de La Robla are three air-conditioned coaches with bar service. The coaches, designed for conferences, talks, courses, and meetings, are equipped with modern technological facilities. All interior areas of the train are connected, enabling passengers to move freely throughout the coaches.
Expreso de La Robla

Russia

Golden Eagle Trans-Siberian Express
The Golden Eagle Trans-Siberian Express began operation in April 2007 and takes passengers on a  trip (the world's longest train journey) across two continents and eight time zones. The Golden Eagle follows the Trans-Siberian Railway, which connects Moscow and European Russia with the Russian Far East, Mongolia, China, and the Sea of Japan.

Canada

Rocky Mountaineer

Rocky Mountaineer is a Canadian company which operates trains touring the Canadian Rockies and the northwestern U.S. Via Rail sold off its Rockies by Daylight scenic train to Rocky Mountaineer Vacations (which became Rocky Mountaineer) in 1990. Rocky Mountaineer operates four routes.

Royal Canadian Pacific

The Royal Canadian Pacific is a luxury overnight passenger train based in Calgary. The train has a royal warrant from Queen Elizabeth. The train makes charter runs along Canadian Pacific Railway (CPR) tracks in summer and fall, taking passengers into the Rocky Mountains of Alberta and British Columbia. A typical six-day, five-night round trip runs through the Columbia River valley and Crowsnest Pass. The train halts at night to enable passengers to enjoy all the scenery. It consists of up to ten CPR luxury passenger cars (built between 1916 and 1931), two fully restored 1950s locomotives and a booster unit. The CPR also owns a modern diesel GP38-2 locomotive, numbered 3084, for backup use.

Japan
Seven Stars in Kyushu is a deluxe sleeping-car excursion train which has toured the island of Kyushu since October 2013. Its name derives from Kyushu's seven prefectures and the train's seven cars. The train has a piano, bar, suites, a mini-kitchen, a crew room, shower rooms, and toilets. It has two- and four-day round trips, departing from Hakata Station. The two-day tour visits Nagasaki, Aso and Yufuin, and the four-day tour visits Yufuin, Miyazaki, Miyakonojō, Hayato, Kagoshima-Chuo, Kagoshima, Aso, and Bungo-Mori.

India

Luxury trains in India include the Palace on Wheels, Deccan Odyssey, Golden Chariot and Maharajas' Express. Two destinations have been added to Royal Rajasthan on Wheels: Khajuraho and Varanasi. The 22-coach train can carry 82 passengers and has 13 compartments, two lounges, a spa and a fitness center. The Maharajas' Express is owned and operated by Indian Railways Catering and Tourism Corporation (IRCTC).

South Africa
Rovos Rail started its Pride of Africa service in April 1989, offering pan-African luxury-train journeys spanning seven African countries by rail, air and water.

Australia

The Ghan, a luxury train, runs  through the heart of the Australian continent from Darwin in the north to Adelaide in the south. The Indian Pacific is a long-distance train connecting Sydney on the east coast, Australia's largest city, with Perth on the west coast.

Image gallery

See also
Heritage railway

References